The Osborne PC prototype was a failed prototype personal computer developed in 1983 by Osborne Computer Corporation.

History 
In the early summer of 1983 an effort was launched to produce a version of the Osborne Executive that would be compatible with the IBM PC. Although venture partners had contributed $9 million of funding in April and another $11 million in June, Osborne was unable to raise an additional $20 million considered necessary to get the IBM-compatible product to market. A "tiger team" was formed, primarily to create a prototype DOS compatible printed circuit board and front bezel to accommodate the changes in connectors. The design used many of the parts of the Executive, including the disc drives, display, chassis, power supply and keyboard. It was completed in six weeks and shown to a number of potential investors, but was unable to generate sufficient interest to save the company from bankruptcy.

Production shutdown 
On 2 August, the New Jersey plant was shut down and 89 workers were laid off. A few days later 200 workers were let go from the Hayward, CA, facility. In early September, banks seized the company's accounts receivable. On 9 September an additional 270 more workers were fired and all production ceased, leaving 80 employees on the California payroll. Three days later, on 12 September, Porter Hurt filed suit for $4.5 million owed his firms for PC boards. On 13 September 1983, OCC filed for Chapter 11 protection in Oakland, CA, federal bankruptcy court, listing assets of $40 million, liabilities of $45 million, and 600 creditors.

References

Portable computers
IBM PC compatibles
Prototypes